Binjor - 4MSR (Thed of the local villagers) is an archaeological site in India, near the international border between Punjab and Rajasthan. It is situated a couple of kilometers from Binjor village, Anupgarh tehsil, Sri Ganganagar district.

Site location
The 4MSR site is 5 km west of Anupgarh Fort & Binjor village is further 1.5 km west. 4MSR archaeological site is immediate south of Anupgarh-Binjir Road.

Excavation
4MSR, in the Ghaggar river (Ghaggar-Hakra River) valley and excavated by Archaeological Survey of India (ASI), is widely considered as an Early Harappan and Mature Harappan site (Indus Valley civilization). There are no indications that a Late Harappan phase existed. In the Ghaggar river valley, explorations and excavations had been done in several sites. These sites included Kalibangan, 46 GB and Binjor 1, 2, 3 and 4, Rakhigarhi and Baror.
"The purpose of the present excavation at 4MSR is to learn about the Early Harappan deposits, relationship with other contemporary sites and to fill the gap between the Late Harappan phase and the Painted Grey Ware culture", Sanjay Manjul, Director, the Institute of Archaeology and head of the excavation at 4MSR, said.

Finds
During 2017 excavation, 4000 years old high protein multi-grain laddus were found along with terraçota seal, two bull figurines, etc all of which were part of rituals, likely ancestral worship. Inclusion of various items shows their significance in the agrarian society of that era.

See also
 List of Indus Valley civilisation sites
 List of inventions and discoveries of the Indus Valley Civilisation

References 

Indus Valley civilisation sites
History of Rajasthan
Former populated places in India
Archaeological sites in Rajasthan